The arrondissement of Villeneuve-sur-Lot is an arrondissement of France in the Lot-et-Garonne department in the Nouvelle-Aquitaine région. It has 92 communes.

Composition

The communes of the arrondissement of Villeneuve-sur-Lot, and their INSEE codes, are:
 
 Allez-et-Cazeneuve (47006)
 Anthé (47011)
 Auradou (47017)
 Beaugas (47023)
 Bias (47027)
 Blanquefort-sur-Briolance (47029)
 Boudy-de-Beauregard (47033)
 Bourlens (47036)
 Bournel (47037)
 Cahuzac (47044)
 Cancon (47048)
 Casseneuil (47049)
 Castelnaud-de-Gratecambe (47055)
 Castillonnès (47057)
 Cavarc (47063)
 Cazideroque (47064)
 Condezaygues (47070)
 Courbiac (47072)
 Cuzorn (47077)
 Dausse (47079)
 Dévillac (47080)
 Dolmayrac (47081)
 Doudrac (47083)
 Douzains (47084)
 Ferrensac (47096)
 Fongrave (47099)
 Frespech (47105)
 Fumel (47106)
 Gavaudun (47109)
 Hautefage-la-Tour (47117)
 La Sauvetat-sur-Lède (47291)
 Lacapelle-Biron (47123)
 Lacaussade (47124)
 Lalandusse (47132)
 Laussou (47141)
 Le Temple-sur-Lot (47306)
 Lédat (47146)
 Lougratte (47152)
 Masquières (47160)
 Massels (47161)
 Massoulès (47162)
 Mazières-Naresse (47164)
 Monbahus (47170)
 Monclar (47173)
 Monflanquin (47175)
 Monségur (47178)
 Monsempron-Libos (47179)
 Montagnac-sur-Lède (47181)
 Montastruc (47182)
 Montauriol (47183)
 Montaut (47184)
 Montayral (47185)
 Monviel (47192)
 Moulinet (47193)
 Pailloles (47198)
 Parranquet (47200)
 Paulhiac (47202)
 Penne-d'Agenais (47203)
 Pinel-Hauterive (47206)
 Pujols (47215)
 Rayet (47219)
 Rives (47223)
 Saint-Antoine-de-Ficalba (47228)
 Saint-Aubin (47230)
 Sainte-Colombe-de-Villeneuve (47237)
 Sainte-Livrade-sur-Lot (47252)
 Saint-Étienne-de-Fougères (47239)
 Saint-Étienne-de-Villeréal (47240)
 Saint-Eutrope-de-Born (47241)
 Saint-Front-sur-Lémance (47242)
 Saint-Georges (47328)
 Saint-Martin-de-Villeréal (47256)
 Saint-Maurice-de-Lestapel (47259)
 Saint-Pastour (47265)
 Saint-Quentin-du-Dropt (47272)
 Saint-Sylvestre-sur-Lot (47280)
 Saint-Vite (47283)
 Salles (47284)
 Sauveterre-la-Lémance (47292)
 Savignac-sur-Leyze (47295)
 Sembas (47297)
 Sérignac-Péboudou (47299)
 Thézac (47307)
 Tombebœuf (47309)
 Tourliac (47311)
 Tournon-d'Agenais (47312)
 Tourtrès (47313)
 Trémons (47314)
 Trentels (47315)
 Villebramar (47319)
 Villeneuve-sur-Lot (47323)
 Villeréal (47324)

History

The arrondissement of Villeneuve-sur-Lot was created in 1800.

As a result of the reorganisation of the cantons of France which came into effect in 2015, the borders of the cantons are no longer related to the borders of the arrondissements. The cantons of the arrondissement of Villeneuve-sur-Lot were, as of January 2015:

 Cancon
 Castillonnès
 Fumel
 Monclar
 Monflanquin
 Penne-d'Agenais
 Sainte-Livrade-sur-Lot
 Tournon-d'Agenais
 Villeneuve-sur-Lot-Nord
 Villeneuve-sur-Lot-Sud
 Villeréal

References

Villeneuve-sur-Lot